Cleistoiodophanus is a genus of fungi in the Ascobolaceae family. The genus is monotypic, containing the single species Cleistoiodophanus conglutinatus, found in the United States.

References

External links

Fungi of North America
Monotypic Ascomycota genera
Pezizales